Dumitriu is a surname of Romanian origin. Notable people with the surname include: 

Anna Dumitriu (born 1969), British visual and performance artist
Dumitru Dumitriu (born 1945), Romanian footballer and coach
Ioana Dumitriu (born 1976), Romanian-American professor of mathematics
Petru Dumitriu (1924–2002), Romanian novelist

See also
Dumitru

Romanian-language surnames